Young Winston is a 1972 British biographical adventure drama war film covering the early years of British Prime Minister Winston Churchill, based in particular on his 1930 book, My Early Life. The first part of the film covers Churchill's unhappy schooldays, up to the death of his father. The second half covers his service as a cavalry officer in India and the Sudan, during which he takes part in the cavalry charge at Omdurman, his experiences as a war correspondent in the Second Boer War, during which he is captured and escapes, and his election to Parliament at the age of 26.

Churchill was played by Simon Ward, who was relatively unknown at the time but was supported by a distinguished cast including Robert Shaw (as Lord Randolph Churchill), John Mills (as Lord Kitchener), Anthony Hopkins (as David Lloyd George)  and Anne Bancroft as Churchill's mother Jennie. Other actors included Patrick Magee, Robert Hardy, Ian Holm, Edward Woodward and Jack Hawkins.

The film was written and produced by Carl Foreman and directed by Richard Attenborough. It was nominated for three Academy Awards: Best Screenplay, Best Art Direction (Donald M. Ashton, Geoffrey Drake, John Graysmark, William Hutchinson, Peter James) and Best Costume Design.

Plot

16 September 1897. Churchill is a junior officer in India determined to make a name for himself and to become a member of Parliament. As the older Churchill (voiced by Simon Ward) narrates, events shift back to his childhood. As a boy, Churchill is sent to a preparatory boarding school but is unhappy there and is removed by his parents after a particularly vicious caning by the sadistic headmaster. Later, at the entrance examination to Harrow School, Churchill submits a blank paper; however the headmaster, James Welldon, sees Churchill's potential and accepts him. One evening he recites a long poem of 1000 lines at a Harrow presentation. His nanny comes to listen but his parents do not, despite Churchill's express invitation. Churchill would later describe her as the only person who never let him down.

Meanwhile, Churchill's father Lord Randolph destroys his career by resigning as Chancellor of the Exchequer; George Buckle, editor of The Times, refuses to support his position. Doctors Roose and Buzzard inform Lady Churchill that her that her husband has an incurable disease, will probably die in five or six years, and that they must never again have "physical relations".

One morning, Churchill comes down to breakfast but his behaviour infuriates his father. Lord Randolph angrily sends his son up to his room, but after a conversation with his wife he goes to make up with his son, who is playing with his large collection of tin soldiers. Churchill eagerly accepts his father's suggestion that he go into the army; his father later admits to his mother that he feels Winston lacks the brains for university or a career as a barrister. After three attempts, Churchill is finally accepted by Sandhurst but his father is not pleased because he finished seventh from the bottom of the class and is only eligible to enter the cavalry which costs an extra £200 a year for a horse. Lord Randolph - clearly ill and making a number of factual errors about his son - scolds Churchill and warns him to face up to his responsibilities at Sandhurst and that if he does not make something of himself by 21 he will no longer support him.

Still only in his mid forties, Lord Randolph, once a brilliant debater, makes an incoherent speech in Parliament, witnessed by both his wife and Winston. His death spells the end of Churchill's dream of entering Parliament at his side. Churchill graduates from Sandhurst near the top of the class, he becomes a second lieutenant and eventually goes to India and then takes part in the cavalry charge at the Battle of Omdurman in the Sudan. Later, he goes to South Africa to work as a war correspondent during the Anglo-Boer War. While travelling by armoured train, Churchill and soldiers are ambushed by Boers. They try to retreat but crash into a barricade of rocks on the railway track. Churchill courageously organises the soldiers to push the derailed carriage off the track so the train can proceed with the wounded, but the others are captured by the Boers. Churchill escapes, getting help from mine manager Howard, hiding three nights in the mine then riding a goods train into neutral Portuguese territory. He returns to England a hero, stands for the parliamentary seat of Oldham and wins, becoming an MP in a Conservative majority Parliament. With the encouragement of opposition Liberal MP Lloyd George, to the dismay of his mother and annoyance of senior Conservatives, he takes up his father's campaign to limit spending on the military.

The film ends with Sir Winston Churchill narrating events that follow including his marriage to Clementine Hozier seven years later. Newsreel footage shows Churchill appearing on the balcony with the Royal family on VE Day, May 1945.

Cast

Production

Carl Foreman was invited to meet Winston Churchill after he had seen and enjoyed Foreman's 1961 production of The Guns of Navarone. At their meeting Churchill suggested that his book My Early Life would make an excellent film.

In 1967 Foreman announced James Fox would play Churchill.

Foreman was impressed by Richard Attenborough's Oh! What a Lovely War and at first wanted him to both direct and play Lord Randolph Churchill; Attenborough declined the latter offer.

The film was made in Morocco and the United Kingdom, with several scenes shot at Penwyllt and Coelbren, Powys, on the edge of the Brecon Beacons, and the scene where Churchill learnt to ride at the Cavalry Riding School building at Beaumont Barracks in Aldershot.

Reception

Box office
The film was one of the most popular films in 1972 at the British box office. Ward was nominated for the Most Promising Male Newcomer award at the Golden Globe Awards in January 1973. 

The film's U.S. premiere was held at the MacArthur Theatre in Washington, D.C., attended by Ward, members of the British embassy and as well as invited guests from the area, including the symphonic band from Winston Churchill High School in nearby Potomac, Maryland, conducted by Ronald Shurie.
The film was premiered in the UK with Susan Hampshire and the youngest Winston of the cast on stage at the time. The band of the Royal Hussars (PWO) played at the screening.

Accolades

Home media release
As of July 2009, the longest edition available on DVD was Young Winston: Special Edition at 146 minutes, cut from the original U.S. theatrical release which was 157 minutes. VHS tapes cut the film to just 124 minutes.
The "Signature Series" edition, released by Sony Entertainment in Australia 2009 (147 minutes) opens with nearly four minutes of black screen accompanied by a medley of English tunes; an "intermission" of three minutes' black screen separates the two sections.
The fully unabridged version was released on Blu-ray by British distributor Powerhouse Films in October 2019.

References

Further reading

External links

1972 films
1970s biographical films
1970s historical films
1972 war films
British historical films
British war films
British biographical films
1970s English-language films
Second Boer War films
Films directed by Richard Attenborough
Columbia Pictures films
Films set in England
Films about Winston Churchill
Films set in the British Empire
Films set in South Africa
Films set in the British Raj
Films set in Sudan
Films set in the 1870s
Films set in the 19th century
Films set in the 1880s
Films set in the 1890s
Films set in the 1900s
Films based on autobiographies
Cultural depictions of Winston Churchill
Cultural depictions of David Lloyd George
Cultural depictions of Herbert Kitchener, 1st Earl Kitchener
Films with screenplays by Carl Foreman
1970s British films